NeXT, Inc. (later NeXT Computer, Inc. and NeXT Software, Inc.) was an American technology company that specialized in computer workstations intended for higher education and business use. Based in Redwood City, California, and founded by Apple Computer co-founder and CEO Steve Jobs after he was forced out of Apple, the company introduced their first product, the NeXT Computer, in 1988, and then the smaller NeXTcube and NeXTstation in 1990. These computers had relatively limited sales, with only about 50,000 units shipped in total. Nevertheless, their object-oriented programming and graphical user interfaces were trendsetters of computer innovation, and highly influential.

NeXT partnered with Sun Microsystems to create a programming environment called OpenStep, which was the NeXTSTEP operating system's application layer hosted on a third-party operating system. In 1993, NeXT withdrew from the hardware industry to concentrate on marketing OPENSTEP for Mach, its own OpenStep implementation, for several other computer vendors. NeXT also developed WebObjects, one of the first enterprise web application frameworks, and although its market appeal was limited by its high $50,000 price, it is a prominent early example of a web server that is based on dynamic page generation rather than static content.

Apple purchased NeXT in 1997 for $400 million, which included 1.5 million shares of Apple stock, and Jobs, the chairman and CEO of NeXT, was given an advisory role at Apple. Apple also promised that NeXT's operating system would be ported to Macintosh hardware, and combined with the classic Mac OS operating system, which would yield Mac OS X, later called macOS.

History

Background
In 1985, Apple co-founder and CEO Steve Jobs led a division campaign called SuperMicro, which was responsible for developing the Macintosh and Lisa computers. They were commercial successes on university campuses because Jobs had personally visited a few notable universities to promote his products, and also because of Apple University Consortium, a marketing program that allowed academics to buy them at a discount. The Consortium had earned over $50 million on computer sales by February 1984.

Jobs met Paul Berg, a Nobel Laureate in chemistry, at a luncheon held in Silicon Valley to honor President of France François Mitterrand. Berg was frustrated by the time and expense of researching recombinant DNA via wet laboratories, and suggested that Jobs should use his influence to create a "3M computer" that is designed for higher education use.

Jobs was intrigued by Berg's concept of a workstation and contemplated starting a higher-education computer company in late 1985, amid increasing turmoil at Apple. Jobs's division did not release the upgraded versions of the Macintosh computer and much of the Macintosh Office software. As a result, its sales plummeted, and Apple was forced to write off millions of dollars in unsold inventory. In 1985, John Sculley ousted Jobs from his executive role at Apple and replaced him with Jean-Louis Gassée. Later that year, Jobs began a power struggle to regain control over his company. The board of directors sided with Sculley, and Jobs took a business trip to Western Europe and the Soviet Union on behalf of Apple.

Original NeXT team
 
In September 1985, after several months of being sidelined, Jobs resigned from Apple. He told the board he was leaving to set up a new computer company, and that he would be taking several Apple employees from the SuperMicro division with him, but he also promised that his new company would not compete with Apple and might even consider licensing their designs to them under the Macintosh brand.

A number of former Apple employees followed him to NeXT, including Joanna Hoffman, Bud Tribble, George Crow, Rich Page, Susan Barnes, Susan Kare, and Dan'l Lewin. After consulting with major educational buyers from around the country, including a follow-up meeting with Paul Berg, a tentative specification for the workstation was drawn up. It was designed to be powerful enough to run wet-lab simulations and affordable enough for college students to use in their dormitory rooms. Before the specifications were finished, however, Apple sued NeXT on September 23, 1985, for "nefarious schemes" to take advantage of the cofounders' insider information. Jobs argued, "It is hard to think that a $2 billion company with 4,300-plus people couldn't compete with six people in blue jeans." The suit was eventually dismissed before trial.

Jobs recalled, "I asked him if he would come up with a few options, and he said, 'No, I will solve your problem for you and you will pay me. You don't have to use the solution. If you want options go talk to other people. Rand created a 20-page brochure detailing the brand, including the precise angle used for the logo (28°) and a new company name spelling, NeXT.

1987–1993: NeXT Computer

First generation

In mid-1986, NeXT changed its business plan to develop both computer hardware and software, rather than just workstations. Rich Page, a NeXT cofounder who formerly directed Apple Lisa's team, led a team to develop the hardware, while Mach kernel engineer Avie Tevanian led the development of NeXT's operating system, NeXTSTEP. NeXT's first factory was established in Fremont, California in 1987, and it was capable of manufacturing about 150,000 machines per year. NeXT's first workstation was named the NeXT Computer. It was also nicknamed as "the cube" due to its distinctive magnesium  cubic case. The case was designed by Hartmut Esslinger and his team at Frog Design.

In 1987, Ross Perot became NeXT's first major outside-investor. He invested $20 million for 16% of NeXT's stock after seeing a segment about NeXT on a 1986 PBS documentary titled Entrepreneurs. In 1988, he joined the company's board of directors.

NeXT and Adobe collaborated on Display PostScript (DPS), a 2D graphics engine that was released in 1987. NeXT engineers wrote an alternative windowing engine edition to take full advantage of NeXTSTEP. NeXT engineers used Display PostScript to draw on-screen graphic designs such as title-bar and scroller for NeXTSTEP's user-space windowing system library.

On October 12, 1988, the NeXT Computer received standing ovations when it was revealed at a private gala event, "NeXT Introductionthe Introduction to the NeXT Generation of Computers for Education" at the Louise M. Davies Symphony Hall in San Francisco, California. The following day, selected educators and software engineers were invited to attend the first public technical overview of the NeXT computer at the event "The NeXT Day" held at the San Francisco Hilton. The event gave developers interested in NeXT software an insight into their architecture, object-oriented programming, and the NeXT Computer. The luncheon speaker was Steve Jobs.

The first NeXT Computers were experimented in 1989, after which NeXT sold a limited number of these devices to universities with a beta version of the NeXTSTEP operating system pre-installed. The computer was widely reviewed in magazines, primarily the hardware portion. When asked if he was upset that the computer's debut was delayed by several months, Jobs responded, "Late? This computer is five years ahead of its time!"

The NeXT Computer was based on the 25 MHz Motorola 68030 central processing unit (CPU). The Motorola 88000 RISC chip was originally considered, but it was not available in sufficient quantities. The computer included between 8 and 64 MB of random-access memory (RAM), a 256 MB magneto-optical (MO) drive, a 40 MB (swap-only), 330 MB, or 660 MB hard disk drive, 10BASE2 Ethernet, NuBus, and a 17-inch MegaPixel grayscale display measuring 1120 by 832 pixels. In 1989, a typical new PC, Macintosh, or Amiga computer included a few megabytes of RAM, a 640×480 16-color or a 320x240 4,096-color display, a 10- to 20-megabyte hard drive, and few networking capabilities. It was the first computer to ship with a general-purpose DSP chip (Motorola 56001) on the motherboard. This supported sophisticated music and sound processing, including the Music Kit software.

The magneto-optical (MO) drive manufactured by Canon Inc. was the primary mass storage device. This drive technology was relatively new to the market, and the NeXT was the first computer to use it. MO drives were cheaper but much slower than hard drives, with an average seek time of 96 ms; Jobs negotiated Canon's initial price of $150 per blank MO disk so that they could sell at retail for only $50. The disk drive's design made it impossible to move files between computers without a network, because each NeXT Computer has only one MO drive and the disk could not be removed without shutting down the system. The drive's limited speed and capacity made it insufficient as the primary medium running the NeXTSTEP operating system.

In 1989, NeXT struck a deal for former Compaq reseller Businessland to sell the NeXT Computer in international markets. Selling through a retailer was a major change from NeXT's original business model of only selling directly to students and educational institutions. Businessland founder David Norman predicted that sales of the NeXT Computer would surpass sales of Compaq computers after 12 months.

That same year, Canon invested US$100 million in NeXT, for a 16.67 percent stake, making NeXT worth almost $600 million. Canon invested in NeXT with the condition of installing the NeXTSTEP environment on its own workstations, which would mean a greatly expanded market for the software. After NeXT exited the hardware business, Canon produced a line of PCs called object.station—including models 31, 41, 50, and 52—specifically designed to run NeXTSTEP on Intel chips. Canon also served as NeXT's distributor in Japan.

In June 1991, Perot resigned from the board of directors to concentrate more time in his company, Perot Systems, a Plano, Texas–based software system integrator.

Second generation

In 1990, NeXT released a second generation of workstations: a revised NeXT Computer NeXTcube and the NeXTstation. The NeXTstation was nicknamed "the slab" for its low-rise box form-factor. Jobs ensured that NeXT staffers did not nickname the NeXTstation "pizza box" to avoid inadvertent comparison with competitor Sun workstations, which already had that nickname.

The machines were initially planned to use the 2.88 MB floppy drive, but the 2.88 MB floppy disks were expensive, and its technology failed to supplant the 1.44 MB floppy. Realizing this, NeXT used the CD-ROM drive instead, which would eventually become the standard for storage.  Color graphics were available on the NeXTstation Color and NeXTdimension graphics processor hardware for the NeXTcube. The new computers, with the new Motorola 68040 processor, were cheaper and faster than their predecessors.

In 1992, NeXT launched "Turbo" variants of the NeXTcube and NeXTstation, with a 33 MHz 68040 processor and the maximum RAM capacity increased to 128 MB. In 1992, NeXT sold 20,000 computers, counting upgraded motherboards on back order as system sales. This was a small number compared with competitors, but the company reported sales of $140 million for the year, which encouraged Canon to invest a further $30 million to keep the company afloat.

In total, 50,000 NeXT machines were sold, including thousands to the then super-secret National Reconnaissance Office located in Chantilly, Virginia. NeXT's long-term plan was to migrate to one of the emerging high-performance Reduced Instruction Set Computing (RISC) architectures, with the NeXT RISC Workstation (NRW). Initially, the NRW was to be based on the Motorola 88110 processor, but it was later redesigned around dual PowerPC 601s, due to a lack of confidence in Motorola's commitment to the 88000-series architecture in the time leading up to the AIM alliance's transition to PowerPC.

1993–1996: NeXT Software, Inc.

In late 1991, because of NeXT's future withdrawal from the hardware industry, the company started porting the NeXTSTEP operating system to the  Intel 80486-based IBM PC compatible computers. In January 1992, a demonstration of the port was shown at NeXTWorld Expo. By mid-1993 the process was completed, and version 3.1 (NeXTSTEP 486) was released.

NeXTSTEP 3.x was later ported to PA-RISC- and SPARC-based platforms, for a total of four versions: NeXTSTEP/NeXT (for NeXT's own hardware), NeXTSTEP/Intel, NeXTSTEP/PA-RISC, and NeXTSTEP/SPARC. Although the latter three ports were not widely used, NeXTSTEP gained popularity at institutions such as First Chicago NBD, Swiss Bank Corporation, O'Connor and Company, and other organizations, owing to its programming model. The software was used by many U.S. government agencies, including the United States Naval Research Laboratory, the National Security Agency, the Advanced Research Projects Agency, the Central Intelligence Agency, and the National Reconnaissance Office. Some IBM PC clone vendors offered somewhat customized hardware solutions that were delivered running NeXTSTEP on Intel, such as the Elonex NextStation and the Canon object.station 41.

In 1993, NeXT withdrew from the hardware industry, and the company was renamed to NeXT Software, Inc. Consequently, 230 of the 530 staff employees were laid off. NeXT negotiated to sell the hardware business, including the Fremont factory, to Canon, which later pulled out of the deal. Work on the PowerPC machines was stopped, along with all hardware production. Sun CEO, Scott McNealy, announced plans to invest $10 million in 1993 and use NeXT software in future Sun systems. NeXT partnered with Sun to create a programming environment called OpenStep, which is NeXTSTEP's application layer hosted on a third party operating system. In 1994, Microsoft and NeXT were collaborating on a Windows NT port of OpenStep which was never released.

Stepstone, originally named Productivity Products International (PPI), was a software company founded in 1983 by Brad Cox and Tom Love, best known for releasing the original version of the Objective-C programming language. In April 1995, NeXT acquired the Objective-C trademark and rights from Stepstone.  At the same time, Stepstone licensed back from NeXT the right to continue selling their Objective-C based products. As Apple Computer acquired NeXT a year later, they now hold the rights to Objective-C. The U.S. software company Stepstone appears to have gone out of business in the early 2000s. 

After exiting the hardware business, NeXT focused on other operating systems. New products based on OpenStep were released, including OpenStep Enterprise, a version for Microsoft's Windows NT. NeXT launched WebObjects, a platform for building large-scale dynamic web applications. It failed to achieve wide popularity, partly because of the initial high price of US$50,000; but it remains the first and most prominent early example of a web application server that enabled dynamic page generation based on user interactions as opposed to static content. The platform was bundled with macOS Server and Xcode, but was removed in 2009 and discontinued in 2016. It was used for a short of period of time by many large businesses, including Dell, Disney, WorldCom, and the BBC. WebObjects would eventually be used to power Apple's iTunes Store and most of its corporate website for years, with parts of the iTunes Store and Apple Music remaining powered by it to this day.

1996–2006: Acquisition by Apple

On December 20, 1996, Apple Computer announced its intention to acquire NeXT. Apple paid $400 million in cash and shares. Though Steve Jobs preferred to only receive cash, Gil Amelio insisted he take 1.5 million Apple shares to give the deal "credibility". The main purpose of the acquisition was to use NeXTSTEP as a foundation to replace the dated classic Mac OS. Steve Jobs also returned to Apple as a consultant. The night of the deal, Jobs commented:

The NeXT deal was finalized on February 7, 1997, In 2000, Jobs took the CEO position as a permanent assignment, holding the position until his resignation on August 24, 2011, shortly before his death on October 5, 2011.

Several NeXT executives replaced their Apple counterparts when Jobs restructured the company's board of directors. Over the next five years the NeXTSTEP operating system was ported to the PowerPC architecture. At the same time, an Intel port and OpenStep Enterprise toolkit for Windows were both produced. That operating system was code-named Rhapsody, while the crossplatform toolkit was called "Yellow Box". For backward compatibility, Apple added the "Blue Box" to Rhapsody, allowing existing Mac applications to be run in a self-contained cooperative multitasking environment.

A server version of the new operating system was released as Mac OS X Server 1.0 in 1999, and the first consumer version, Mac OS X 10.0, in 2001. The OpenStep developer toolkit was renamed Cocoa. Rhapsody's Blue Box was renamed Classic Environment and changed to run applications full-screen without requiring a separate window. Apple included an updated version of the original Macintosh toolbox, called Carbon, that gave existing Mac applications access to the environment without the constraints of Blue Box. Some of NeXTSTEP's interface features are used in Mac OS X, including the Dock, the Services menu, the Finder's "Column" view, and the Cocoa text system.

NeXTSTEP's processor-independent capabilities were retained in Mac OS X, leading to PowerPC, x86, and ARM versions (although only PowerPC versions were publicly available before 2006 and were discontinued by 2009, and ARM versions were not available until 2020). Apple moved to Intel processors by August 2006, and is in the process of moving to ARM processors as of September 2022.

Corporate culture and community

Jobs created a different corporate culture at NeXT in terms of facilities, salaries, and benefits. Jobs had experimented with some structural changes at Apple, but at NeXT he abandoned conventional corporate structures, instead making a "community" with "members" instead of employees. There were only two different salaries at NeXT until the early 1990s. Team members who joined before 1986 were paid  and those who joined afterward were paid . This caused a few awkward situations where managers were paid less than their employees. Later, employees were given performance reviews and raises every six months. To foster openness, all employees had full access to the payrolls, although few employees ever took advantage of the privilege. NeXT's health insurance plan offered benefits to not only married couples but unmarried and same-sex couples, although the latter privilege was later withdrawn due to insurance complications. The payroll schedule was also very different from other companies in Silicon Valley at the time, because instead of employees being paid twice a month at the end of the pay period, they were paid once a month in advance.

Jobs found office space in Palo Alto, California, at 3475 Deer Creek Road, occupying a glass-and-concrete building that featured a staircase designed by the architect I. M. Pei. The first floor had hardwood flooring and large worktables where the workstations would be assembled. To avoid inventory errors, NeXT used the just-in-time (JIT) inventory strategy. The company contracted out for all major components, such as mainboards and cases, and had the finished components shipped to the first floor for assembly. On the second floor was office space with an open floor plan. The only enclosed rooms were Jobs's office and a few conference rooms.

As NeXT expanded, more office space was needed. The company rented an office at 800 and 900 Chesapeake Drive, in Redwood City, also designed by Pei. The architectural centerpiece was a "floating" staircase with no visible supports. The open floor plan was retained, with furnishings that were luxurious, such as $5,000 chairs, $10,000 sofas, and Ansel Adams prints.

NeXT's Palo Alto office was subsequently occupied by Internet Shopping Network (a subsidiary of Home Shopping Network) in 1994, and later by SAP AG. Its Redwood City office was later occupied by ApniCure and OncoMed Pharmaceuticals Inc.

The first issue of NeXTWORLD magazine was printed in 1991. It was edited by Michael Miley and, later, Dan Ruby and was published in San Francisco by Integrated Media. It was the only mainstream periodical to discuss NeXT computers, their operating system, and NeXT application software. The publication was discontinued in 1994 after only four volumes. A developer conference, NeXTWORLD Expo, was held in 1991 and 1992 at the San Francisco Civic Center and in 1993 and 1994 at the Moscone Center in San Francisco, with Jobs as the keynote speaker.

Legacy
Though not very profitable, the company had a wide-ranging impact on the computer industry. Object-oriented programming and graphical user interfaces became more common after the 1988 release of the NeXTcube and NeXTSTEP. The technologically successful platform was often held as the trendsetter when other companies started to emulate the success of NeXT's object-oriented system.

Widely seen as a response to NeXT, Microsoft announced the Cairo project in 1991; the Cairo specification included similar object-oriented user-interface features for a coming consumer version of Windows NT. Although Cairo was ultimately abandoned, some elements were integrated into other projects.

By 1993, Taligent was considered by the press to be a competitor in objects and operating systems, even without any product release, with NeXT being a main point of comparison. For the first few years, Taligent's theoretical innovation was often compared to NeXT's older but mature and commercially established platform, but Taligent's debut release in 1995 was called "too little, too late", especially when compared with NeXT.

Several developers used the NeXT platform to write pioneering programs. For example, in 1990, Computer Scientist Tim Berners-Lee used a NeXT Computer to develop the first web browser and web server. The game series Doom, and Quake were developed by id Software with NeXT computers. Other commercial programs were released for NeXT computers, including Altsys Virtuoso—a vector-drawing program with page-layout features, which was ported to Mac OS and Microsoft Windows as Aldus FreeHand v4—and the Lotus Improv spreadsheet program.

See also

 NeXT character set
 Multi-architecture binary

Notes

References

Further reading

External links

 
1985 establishments in California
1997 disestablishments in California
1997 mergers and acquisitions
American companies established in 1985
American companies disestablished in 1997
Apple Inc. acquisitions
Companies based in Redwood City, California
Computer companies established in 1985
Computer companies disestablished in 1997
Defunct companies based in the San Francisco Bay Area
Defunct computer companies based in California
Defunct computer companies of the United States
Defunct computer hardware companies
Defunct software companies of the United States
Privately held companies based in California
Steve Jobs
Technology companies based in the San Francisco Bay Area
Technology companies established in 1985
Technology companies disestablished in 1997